Air Canada is the largest airline and flag carrier of Canada. Founded in 1937 as Trans Canada Air Lines, it provides scheduled services to 194 destinations on six continents. Its largest hub is Toronto Pearson International Airport, followed by Montréal–Trudeau International Airport, Vancouver International Airport and Calgary International Airport. Air Canada is the world's 10th largest passenger airline by fleet size, and the airline is a founding member of Star Alliance. In 2014, Air Canada together with its Air Canada Express regional partners carried over 38 million passengers. Between them, they operate on average more than 1,500 scheduled flights daily.

The list shows airports that are served by Air Canada as part of its scheduled service. It excludes airports only operated by Air Canada Rouge, Air Canada Express regional partners and other charter services. The list includes the International Civil Aviation Organization (ICAO) code, city, province, country, the airport's name—with the airline's hubs and focus cities marked, airports served by main-haul operation of Air Canada, terminated and seasonal routes.

List of destinations served by Air Canada

List of destinations served by Air Canada Cargo

List of destinations served by Air Canada Rouge

List of destinations served by Air Canada Express

See also
List of Jazz Aviation destinations

References

External links 
 
 Air Canada's Route Map
 Air Canada's Timetable

Destinations
Air Canada
Air Canada